Frits van Bindsbergen (born 18 August 1960 in Babberich) is a road cyclist from Netherlands. He became world champion in the team time trial at the 1982 UCI Road World Championships together with Maarten Ducrot, Gerrit Solleveld and Gerard Schipper. He won a stage in the Olympia's Tour in 1982.

References

External links
 profile at Cyclingarchives.com

1960 births
Living people
Dutch male cyclists
People from Zevenaar
Cyclists from Gelderland